Great Britain competed at the 1980 Summer Paralympics Arnhem, Netherlands. It finished 5th in the overall medal count, with a total of 100 medals.

Medallists
The following British competitors won medals at the Games. In the 'by discipline' sections below, medallists' names are in bold.

Medals by sport

See also 
 1980 Summer Paralympics
 Great Britain at the 1980 Summer Olympics

Notes

External links
British Paralympic Association Website

Nations at the 1980 Summer Paralympics